Brenda Wren Burman (born August 2, 1967) is an American attorney and government official who served as commissioner of the United States Bureau of Reclamation from 2017 to 2021. Prior to assuming that position, she served as director of water strategy at the Salt River Project. Burman served in the George W. Bush administration as Deputy Commissioner of the U.S. Bureau of Reclamation and as Deputy Assistant Secretary for Water and Science. She has previously held positions with the Metropolitan Water District of Southern California, The Nature Conservancy, and U.S. Senator Jon Kyl.

Early life and education
Burman was born in Santa Clara County, California and grew up in Minnesota and New Jersey. She earned a Bachelor of Arts degree from Kenyon College in 1989, where she was a member of the college's field hockey team. After college, Burman worked as a volunteer trail crew member at Carlsbad Caverns National Park and became a park ranger at the Grand Canyon. She attended law school at the University of Arizona School of Law, earning a Juris Doctor in 1996.

Career 
After law school, she served as a clerk on the Wyoming Supreme Court. Burman worked for four years in private practice, where she handled natural resource issues. In 2002, she became legislative counsel for energy and water for U.S. Senator Jon Kyl. As an attorney, Burman dealt extensively with Native American water rights issues.

In 2005, Burman took a role with the United States Department of the Interior as counselor to the assistant secretary for water and science. She later transitioned to the United States Bureau of Reclamation, where she served as deputy commissioner for external and intergovernmental affairs. Burman rejoined the U.S. Department of the Interior as a deputy assistant secretary in 2007.

Burman left the federal government at the end of the George W. Bush administration, joining The Nature Conservancy as senior water policy administrator. In 2011, she took a role with the Metropolitan Water District of Southern California as special projects manager. In 2015, Burman became executive water policy adviser and director of water strategy at the Salt River Project.

United States Bureau of Reclamation
On June 26, 2017, President Donald Trump nominated Burman to serve as the next Commissioner of the United States Bureau of Reclamation. She was confirmed by the United States Senate on November 16, 2017. Burman is the first woman to ever lead the Bureau of Reclamation. Her nomination was commented upon favorably by a number of public officials, including U.S. Senators Jeff Flake and John McCain; Arizona Governor Doug Ducey; and Congressman Paul Gosar. She left office on January 20, 2021.

References

1967 births
Living people
Kenyon College alumni
James E. Rogers College of Law alumni
21st-century American lawyers
20th-century American lawyers
George W. Bush administration personnel
Trump administration personnel
United States Bureau of Reclamation personnel